Colin Prior (born 1958 in Milngavie, Glasgow), is a landscape photographer.

Prior takes panoramic landscape photographs of Scotland and around the world. He uses the 617 panoramic format extensively in his work shooting Fuji Velvia generally in the "golden hour" at dawn and dusk. To date, Colin has worked on four calendar commissions for British Airways and has had several solo exhibitions, most notably The Scottish Visual Experience, Land's End and The World's Wild Places.

In 2007 his work on Canna helped boost visitor numbers to the National Trust for Scotland's HQ.

More recently Colin has appeared on a number of TV Programmes in the UK, including The Adventure Show (BBC), Landward (BBC), Countryfile (BBC) and Weir's Way (STV). He has also guested on numerous topical programmes on BBC Radio Scotland.

Colin currently lives in Glasgow with his wife Geraldine and two children. He is a Fellow of the Royal Photographic Society and a founding member of the International League of Conservation Photographers.

Bibliography 
Highland Wilderness
Constable 

Scotland – The Wild Places
Constable, 

Living Tribes, Constable, 

The World's Wild Places
Constable, 

High Light
Constable, 

Scotland's Finest Landscapes – The Collector's Edition
Constable, 

The Karakoram: Ice Mountains of Pakistan
Merrell, 

Fragile: Birds, Eggs & Habitats
Merrell,

Exhibitions 
The Scottish Visual Experience,
Linhof Gallery, London

Land's End,
Museum of Education, Glasgow

The World's Wild Places,
OXO Tower Gallery, London

The World's Wild Places,
Glasgow Science Centre

References

External links
 Official website
 Member page on the International League of Conservation Photographers website
 Life through a lens: Colin Prior on GuardianUnlimited
 Shooting a Sunset by Colin Prior on Live Life the Bowmore Way
 Colin Prior, Mountain Man The Adventure Show

1958 births
Living people
Scottish photographers
People from Milngavie